{{Speciesbox
|image = Plantillustrations4336.jpg
|image_caption = An 1885 lithograph of Olsynium filifolium, then known as Sisyrinchium filifolium
|genus = Olsynium
|species = filifolium
|authority = Gaudich.
|synonyms_ref =   
|synonyms = Bermudiana filifolia' Olsynium laineziiPhaiophleps laineziiSisyrinchium filifoliumSisyrinchium filiformeSisyrinchium gaudichaudiiSisyrinchium junceum  subsp. filifoliumSymphyostemon lainezii  
}}Olsynium filifolium  (pale maiden), or Bermudiana filifolia,<ref>[http://www.theplantlist.org/tpl1.1/record/kew-326867 The Plant List: Bermudiana filifolia]</ref> is the only species of the iris family native to the Falkland Islands. It is much better known by its former name Sisyrinchium filifolium. Although it is no longer as common as it once was, it is widely distributed on the islands, and favours temperate dwarf shrub heath. It (or a closely related species) is also found in Patagonia.

Description

Flowers are sweet smelling, and bell-shaped with six white tepals with pale purplish-red markings. They bloom in spring, particularly in November.

References

Sisyrinchieae
Flora of the Falkland Islands
Flora of Argentina
Plants described in 1825